Mannavaru Chinnavaru is a 1999 Indian Tamil-language drama film directed by P. N. Ramachandra Rao. The film stars Sivaji Ganesan, Arjun and Soundarya, while Maheswari, Visu and K. R. Vijaya play supporting roles. This is the 100th film for Arjun. The film was a remake of Telugu film Subhavartha, with Arjun and Soundarya reprising their roles from the original version, after Arjun expressed his interest further in remaking the film.

Cast

Production
Arjun expressed his interest in remaking his Telugu film Subhavartha in Tamil reprising his and Soundarya's role for second time in Tamil. Thanu approached Sivaji Ganesan for an important role to which he accepted to act. The film's inauguration function took place in Chennai, at Teynampet, Kamarajar Hall, on 6 August 1998.

Soundtrack
The soundtrack features 5 songs composed by Geethapriyan.

"Adi Paaduthe" - S. P. Balasubrahmanyam
"Kathi Vaitha" - Sukhwinder Singh, Ranjani
"Konji Pesu" - Hariharan, Sadhana Sargam
"Vaannilave" - Mano, Ranjani
"Mannavaru" - Krishnaraj, Ranjani

Reception
A critic from Deccan Herald noted "though thespian Sivaji Ganesan and Soundarya shoulder the film, it is too late for the director to realise his mistakes. If some of the stunt and murder scenes are any indication, it seems the director has no basic knowledge about law and order".

References

1999 films
Indian drama films
Tamil remakes of Telugu films
1990s Tamil-language films